is a railway station  located in the city of Tsugaru, Aomori Prefecture, Japan, operated by the East Japan Railway Company (JR East). The station is a kan'i itaku station, administered by Goshogawara Station, and operated by Tsugaru municipal authority, with point-of-sales terminal installed. Ordinary tickets, express tickets, and reserved-seat tickets for all JR lines are on sale (no connecting tickets).

Lines
Kizukuri Station is served by the Gonō Line.

Station layout
Kizukuri Station has one ground-level side platform serving a single bi-directional track. The station building is attended during normal daylight operating hours.

History
Kizukuri Station was opened on October 21, 1924 as a station on the Mutsu Railway in former Kizukuri Town, and became a station on the Japanese Government Railways (JGR) when the Mutsu Railway was nationalized on June 1, 1927. With the privatization of the Japanese National Railways (successor of JGR) on April 1, 1987, it came under the operational control of JR East. The current station building, decorated with a  huge shakōkidogū statue on its facade, was completed in 1992.

Passenger statistics
In fiscal 2016, the station was used by an average of 212 passengers daily (boarding passengers only).

Surrounding area

 Tsugaru Police station
 Kizukuri Post Office
 Tsugaru City Hall

See also
 List of Railway Stations in Japan

Gallery

References

External links

  

Stations of East Japan Railway Company
Railway stations in Aomori Prefecture
Gonō Line
Tsugaru, Aomori
Railway stations in Japan opened in 1924